Vladimir Micov (born April 16, 1985) is a Serbian former professional basketball player.

Professional career

2001–2009
Micov played for Beopetrol in the second-tier IB Men's League in the 2001–02 season. He joined Crvena zvezda for the 2002–03 season, but would only play for their youth team.

Micov spent the 2003–04 season with OKK Beograd. He then moved to Lavovi 063 in the 2004–05 season. He joined Budućnost Podgorica for the 2005–06 season. He moved on a two-month loan to Partizan in March 2007. He won the Serbian League championship with Partizan in 2007.

He then returned to Budućnost Podgorica for the 2007–08 season.

2009–2012
In 2009, he joined the Greek Basket League club Panionios.

He then moved to the Spanish ACB League club Caja Laboral Baskonia. In January 2010. he joined the Italian League team Pallacanestro Cantù.

CSKA Moscow (2012–2014)
In July 2012, he signed a one-year deal, with an option for a second year, with the Russian team PBC CSKA Moscow. In June 2013, CSKA decided not to use the out option on his contract, and thus kept him in the club for one more season. In July 2014, his contract with CSKA expired, and he became a free agent.

Galatasaray (2014–2017)
On July 14, 2014, he signed with the Turkish team Galatasaray Liv Hospital. On June 15, 2015, he signed a two-year contract extension with the club. In the 2015–16 Eurocup season, he was named to the All-EuroCup First Team. Galatasaray then won the EuroCup championship, later that same season.

Olimpia Milano (2017–2021)
On July 10, 2017, Micov signed with Italian club Olimpia Milano. In 2017–18 LBA season, Olimpia Milano won the championship after 4–2 record in the 2018 LBA Finals over Trento. Over 26 league games, Micov averaged 11.7 points and 3.2 rebounds, while shooting 45.8% from the field. In 2017–18 EuroLeague season, he averaged 10.9 points and 2.6 rebounds over 29 games.

On September 30, 2018, Micov was named MVP of the 2018 Italian Supercup. In 2018–19 season, Olimpia Milano secured the first position in the regular season of Italian League, but was stopped with 3–0 in the semifinal series by Dinamo Sassari. Micov averaged 9.7 points, 2.7 rebounds and 2 assists over 32 games of the Italian League. In 2018–19 EuroLeague, he averaged 13.9 points, 3.2 rebounds and 2.5 assists over 30 games.

On July 2, 2019, Micov signed a two-year contract extension with Olimpia Milano. 

On June 26, 2021, Micov officially parted ways with the Italian club after four seasons.

Budućnost (2021–2022)
On July 16, 2021, Micov has signed with Buducnost VOLI For a Year of the Adriatic League and the Prva A Liga.

On July 10, 2022, Micov announced his retirement from professional basketball.

National team career
Micov won the gold medal at the 2001 FIBA Europe Under-16 Championship as a member of the FR Yugoslavia youth national team. He won the bronze medal at the 2005 FIBA Europe Under-20 Championship, as a member of the Serbia and Montenegro junior national team.

His breakthrough in the senior Serbian national team was set back by injuries, but he was eventually a part of the preliminary Serbia national squad during training camp for the 2014 FIBA Basketball World Cup. The then 29-year-old was widely expected to make the team's final roster cut, however, during the last preparation friendly game, against New Zealand, Micov got into a mid-game argument with Serbian head coach Aleksandar Đorđević, that led to Đorđević taking Micov out of the game, and later expelling him from the bench. At the post-game press conference, the Serbian coach announced that, "Micov's short career in the national squad has ended", with Micov later saying to the media that he read the coach's words, and that he accepted his decision, while also stating that Đorđević was, "maybe too nervous".

In July 2022, Micov stated that he declined to play for Montenegro or North Macedonia, following his exclusion from Serbia national team.

Career statistics

European Competitions

|-
| style="text-align:left;"| 2007–08 EuroCup
| style="text-align:left;"|  Budućnost
| 12 || 11 || 31.2 || 53.1% || 29.2% || 75.6% || 4.8 || 2.0 || 1.2 || 0.1 || 11.8 || 12.6
|-
| style="text-align:left;"| 2008–09 EuroCup
| style="text-align:left;"|  Budućnost
| 6 || 6 || 30.3 || 44.2% || 46.2% || 70.8% || 3.0 || 2.3 || 0.7 || 0.3 || 10.2 || 10.0
|-
| style="text-align:left;"| 2009–10 Euroleague
| style="text-align:left;"|  Caja Laboral
| 7 || 2 || 15.8 || 64.7% || 50.0% || 45.5% || 2.9 || 0.9 || 0.1 || 0.0 || 4.1 || 6.9
|-
| style="text-align:left;"| 2010–11 EuroCup
| style="text-align:left;"|  Bennet Cantù
| 6 || 6 || 28.3 || 50.0% || 50.0% || 55.6% || 4.3 || 3.0 || 1.5 || 0.3 || 10.3 || 15.2
|-
| style="text-align:left;"| 2011–12 Euroleague
| style="text-align:left;"|  Bennet Cantù
| 14 || 14 || 28.8 || 40.8% || 39.4% || 85.7% || 4.1 || 3.2 || 1.1 || 0.4 || 10.4 || 12.1
|-
| style="text-align:left;"| 2012–13 Euroleague
| style="text-align:left;"|  CSKA Moscow
| 30 || 7 || 21.9 || 43.7% || 42.0%|| 60.7% || 2.7 || 1.7 || .6 || 0.2 || 7.6 || 7.0
|-
| style="text-align:left;"| 2013–14 Euroleague
| style="text-align:left;"|  CSKA Moscow
| 31 || 10 || 20.7 || 46.4% || 48.8% || 77.8% || 2.9 || 1.3 || 0.5 || 0.2 || 7.7 || 8.3
|-
| style="text-align:left;"| 2014–15 Euroleague
| style="text-align:left;"|  Galatasaray Liv Hospital
| 20 || 20 || 28.3 || 39.5% || 31.1% || 84.3% || 3.0 || 2.3 || 0.7 || 0.1 || 9.9 || 9.7
|- style="background:#AFE6BA;"
| style="text-align:left;"| 2015–16 EuroCup
| style="text-align:left;"|  Galatasaray Odeabank
| 24 || 23 || 32.2 || 44.6% || 35.4% || 87.5% || 3.7 || 2.8 || 1.0 || 0.3 || 12.9 || 13.2
|-
| style="text-align:left;"| 2016–17 EuroLeague
| style="text-align:left;"|  Galatasaray Odeabank
| 29 || 26 || 29.1 || 42.0% || 43.2% || 76.9% || 3.6 || 2.4 || 0.8 || 0.1 || 11.2 || 11.4
|-
| style="text-align:left;"| 2017–18 EuroLeague
| style="text-align:left;"|  AX Armani Exchange Olimpia
| 29 || 28 || 27.5 || 48.1% || 44.3% || 78.0% || 2.6 || 2.2 || 0.6 || 0.1 || 10.9 || 11.2
|-
| style="text-align:left;"| 2018–19 EuroLeague
| style="text-align:left;"|  AX Armani Exchange Olimpia
| 30 || 30 || 31.4 || 45.6% || 39.4% || 79.0% || 3.2 || 2.5 || 1.1 || 0.1 || 13.9 || 13.7

Domestic Leagues 

|-
| style="text-align:left;"| 2003–04
| style="text-align:left;"|  OKK Beograd
| style="text-align:left;" | Serbia and Montenegro League
| 8 || 6.8 || 33.3% || 40.0% || 60.0% || 1.0 || 0.6 || 0.6 || 0.0 || 1.5
|-
| style="text-align:left;"| 2004–05
| style="text-align:left;"|  Lavovi 063
| style="text-align:left;" | Serbia and Montenegro League
| 1 || 8.0 || 100% || - || 50.0% || 1.0 || 0.0 || 0.0 || 0.0 || 5.0
|-
| style="text-align:left;"| 2005–06
| style="text-align:left;"|  Budućnost
| style="text-align:left;" | Serbia and Montenegro League
| 25 || 29.6 || 53.0% || 30.1% || 54.8% || 4.3 || 1.8 || 1.3 || 0.1 || 8.9
|-
| style="text-align:left;"| 2006-07
| style="text-align:left;"|  Budućnost
| style="text-align:left;" | ABA League
| 26 || 32.1 || 50.7% || 35.0% || 67.5% || 5.0 || 1.8 || 2.2 || 0.1 || 10.5
|-
| style="text-align:left;"| 2007-08
| style="text-align:left;"|  Budućnost
| style="text-align:left;" | ABA League
| 29 || 31.7 || 49.4% || 25.8% || 68.8% || 4.2 || 3.0 || 1.3 || 0.2 || 12.4
|-
| style="text-align:left;" rowspan=2| 2008–09
| style="text-align:left;"|  Budućnost
| style="text-align:left;" | ABA League
| 26 || 31.4 || 49.5% || 28.3% || 75.0% || 4.2 || 2.7 || 2.1 || 0.2 || 13.1
|-
| style="text-align:left;"|  Panionios
| style="text-align:left;" | Greek Basket League
| 6 || 29.4 || 54.0% || 70.0% || 58.3% || 4.2 || 1.2 || 0.7 || 0.0 || 9.0
|-
| style="text-align:left;" rowspan=2| 2009–10
| style="text-align:left;"|  Caja Laboral
| style="text-align:left;" | Liga ACB
| 13 || 12.9 || 40.6% || 18.2% || 75.0% || 1.3 || 0.5 || 0.6 || 0.0 || 2.6
|-
| style="text-align:left;"|  NGC Medical Cantù
| style="text-align:left;" | Serie A
| 23 || 28.7 || 45.5% || 41.8% || 72.9% || 3.8 || 2.7 || 2.0 || 0.1 || 11.5
|-
| style="text-align:left;"| 2010–11
| style="text-align:left;"|  Bennet Cantù
| style="text-align:left;" | Serie A
| 42 || 28.4 || 48.9% || 36.3% || 69.4% || 4.3 || 2.2 || 1.4 || 0.1 || 10.2
|-
| style="text-align:left;"| 2011–12
| style="text-align:left;"|  Bennet Cantù
| style="text-align:left;" | Serie A
| 25 || 24.7 || 43.6% || 41.2% || 82.3% || 3.7 || 2.4 || 0.7 || 0.1 || 10.2
|-|- style="background:#AFE6BA;"
| style="text-align:left;"| 2012–13
| style="text-align:left;" |  CSKA Moscow
| style="text-align:left;" | VTB League
| 31 || 22.0 || 43.6% || 38.1% || 67.1% || 3.1 || 1.4 || 0.6 || 0.1 || 8.6
|-|- style="background:#AFE6BA;"
| style="text-align:left;"| 2013–14
| style="text-align:left;" |  CSKA Moscow
| style="text-align:left;" | VTB League
| 16 || 23.9 || 47.3% || 43.1% || 78.6% || 2.8 || 1.8 || 0.7 || 0.1 || 10.1
|-
| style="text-align:left;"| 2014–15
| style="text-align:left;"|  Galatasaray Liv Hospital
| style="text-align:left;" | Basketbol Süper Ligi
| 28 || 30.9 || 47.2% || 41.9% || 85.7% || 3.4 || 3.1 || 1.2 || 0.2 || 11.3
|-
| style="text-align:left;"| 2015–16
| style="text-align:left;"|  Galatasaray Odeabank
| style="text-align:left;" | Basketbol Süper Ligi
| 36 || 30.6 || 55.4% || 55.9% || 86.5% || 2.0 || 3.1 || 2.2 || 0.2 || 14.3
|-
| style="text-align:left;"| 2016–17
| style="text-align:left;"|  Galatasaray Odeabank
| style="text-align:left;" | Basketbol Süper Ligi
| 30 || 27.4 || 46.6% || 40.1% || 79.6% || 2.0 || 2.7 || 1.1 || 0.1 || 11.6
|- style="background:#AFE6BA;"
| style="text-align:left;"| 2017–18
| style="text-align:left;" |  AX Armani Exchange Milano
| style="text-align:left;" | Serie A
| 39 || 27.2 || 45.3% || 36.0% || 82.7% || 3.5 || 2.5 || 0.9 || 0.0 || 11.6
|-
| style="text-align:left;"| 2018–19
| style="text-align:left;"|  AX Armani Exchange Milano
| style="text-align:left;" | Serie A
| 32 || 27.1 || 44.0% || 37.4% || 82.1% || 2.7 || 2.0 || 0.8 || 0.1 || 9.7

References

External links
 Vladimir Micov at acb.com 
 Vladimir Micov at archive.fiba.com
 Vladimir Micov at euroleague.net
 Vladimir Micov at legabasket.it 
 Vladimir Micov at tblstat.net

1985 births
Living people
ABA League players
Basketball League of Serbia players
Basketball players from Belgrade
Galatasaray S.K. (men's basketball) players
Greek Basket League players
KK Beopetrol/Atlas Beograd players
KK Crvena zvezda youth players
KK Budućnost players
KK Lavovi 063 players
KK Partizan players
Lega Basket Serie A players
Liga ACB players
OKK Beograd players
Olimpia Milano players
Pallacanestro Cantù players
Panionios B.C. players
PBC CSKA Moscow players
Saski Baskonia players
Serbian men's basketball players
Serbian expatriate basketball people in Greece
Serbian expatriate basketball people in Italy
Serbian expatriate basketball people in Montenegro
Serbian expatriate basketball people in Russia
Serbian expatriate basketball people in Spain
Serbian expatriate basketball people in Turkey
Shooting guards
Small forwards